Kevin Patrick McGuff (born December 3, 1969) is an American college basketball coach who the current head women's basketball coach at Ohio State University after spending two seasons as head coach of the University of Washington. Prior to his time in Seattle, McGuff was the head coach at Xavier University until April 2011.

Coaching career
McGuff began his coaching career as an assistant coach at Miami University where the Lady Hawks went 54–30 during his tenure in Oxford, Ohio.

He served as an assistant coach at Notre Dame. During his six years as an Irish assistant coach under Muffet McGraw, Notre Dame went 160–39, including a national title in 2001.

Xavier University

McGuff spent nine seasons at Xavier, compiling an overall record of 213–73, giving him the most wins of any Xavier women's coach. The Musketeers made the postseason in each of McGuff's seasons as head coach, with the last five being in the NCAA tournament. During this stretch, Xavier's best run was in 2010, when the Musketeers lost in the Elite Eight to Stanford.

University of Washington

Ohio State University
McGuff was hired by Ohio State on April 16, 2013 to replace Jim Foster. He was formally introduced at a press conference on April 17, 2013. Ohio State will owe Washington $1.75 million as part of McGuff's buyout clause from his contract with UW.

Head coaching record

* Record adjusted to 18–6 (8–1 in conference) after games vacated
** Record adjusted to 0–6 (0–3 in conference) after games vacated
***Record adjusted to 0–14 (0–8 in conference) after games vacated
****Not including vacated games; McGuff's unofficial record is 219–98 at Ohio State and 474–197 overall

Personal

Kevin attended Saint Joseph's College in Indiana. McGuff and his wife, Letitia, have six children.

References

External links
Kevin McGuff at Ohio State

1969 births
Living people
American women's basketball coaches
Basketball coaches from Ohio
Basketball players from Ohio
Miami RedHawks women's basketball coaches
Notre Dame Fighting Irish women's basketball coaches
Ohio State Buckeyes women's basketball coaches
Saint Joseph's Pumas men's basketball players
Sportspeople from Hamilton, Ohio
Washington Huskies women's basketball coaches
Xavier Musketeers women's basketball coaches
American men's basketball players